Money and Women (transliterated: Mal Wa Nissa, aliases: Fortune and Females) is an Egyptian film released in 1960. The film is directed by Hassan Al-Imam and stars Salah Zulfikar, Soad Hosny and Youssef Wahbi.

Plot 
Shehata Effendi is an employee in a hospital, a simple man with a lively conscience who represents a thorn in the throat of his corrupt colleagues who embezzled from the hospital's warehouses, and they are Badawi, Hanafi, Borai and Bashkatib, Where they agree with the supplier to send his representative in half the quantities, they sign the invoices in the full amount, and they take the difference for themselves away from Shehata, who was living with his wife Amina and his daughter Nemat who aspires to get rich and glory, and loves her neighbor Hussein, the son of Saber, the shoe worker. Hussein was an employee and affiliated with one of the colleges, and he had got engaged to Nemat, but when Shehata Effendi saw them alone on the rooftops, he hurried to marry them, and applied to the Bashkatib with a request for a loan to prepare his daughter needs for the marriage. One of his friends, in return for a trust receipt, pending the disbursement of the advance, and when they were sure that he had spent the amount on his daughter's marriage, the Bashkatib informed him of the refusal of the advance, and demanded that he sponsor return the money or else imprisonment. He discovered the playful Shehata, then assaulted the Bashkatib, was referred to investigation, was dismissed and imprisoned, and his wife fell ill, so he was forced to kiss the foot of the Bashkatib, who demanded that he closes his eyes from the embezzlement, and gave him the amount he requested from his own pocket as a down payment. Shehata closed his eyes, his wife recovered, his daughter married, and she traveled with her husband to the mines of Abu Znaima in the Red Sea, and she suffered from the life of the desert, and her husband was preoccupied with her with his work and lessons, so she rebelled against this life, and a dispute broke out between them, so she left him and returned to Cairo, to discover that her father had left the house, after Amina refused to live with her with forbidden money, and he rented a separate house, and his life changed for the better. Hussein apologised. She told him, “You are the son of nobody, and I am the daughter of a rich man.” Naamat was deceived by false appearances, and her father's shyness indulged himself in wine and women to enjoy what he missed from the pleasures of the world. But the embezzlement was discovered, so his colleagues sponsored the burning of the stores to try to hid the fraud. Shehata tried to save the hospital from the fire. He died on fire. Nemat tried to get back to Hussein, asking for permission, but he refused. But Saber asked him to pardon and to forgive his beloved, who became alone in this world, so he finally forgave her.

Crew 

 Director: Hassan al-Imam
 Screenwriter: 
 Mohamed Othman
 Abdel Rahman Sherif
 Producer: Gabriel Talhamy
 Studio: Gabriel Talhamy Films
 Distributor: Gabriel Talhamy Films
 Cinematographer: Abdel Aziz Fahmy
 Music: Fouad el-Zahery
 Editing: Rachida Abdel Salam

Cast

Main Cast 

 Salah Zulfikar in the role of Hussein
 Soad Hosny in the role of Nemat
 Youssef Wahbi in the role of Shehata
 Amina Rizk in the role of Umm Nemat
 Fakher Fakher in the role Saber
 Tawfiq Al-Daqan in the role of Bora
 Adly Kasseb in the role of Al-Bash Kateb
 Mohamed El-Deeb in the role of Ali
 Mohamed Shawky as Taha Al-Saei
 Mohamed Sobeih in the role of Hanafi
 Ragaa Hussein in the role of Azza
 Abbas Rahmi in the role of the owner of the supply company
 Abdel Moneim Bassiouni in the role of the representative of the supply company

Supporting cast 

 Naamat Mukhtar
 Hussein Ismail
 Salwa Mahmoud
 Nagwa Fouad (Guest appearance)
 Abdul Moneim Saudi
 Abdul Moneim Ismail
 Hussein Kandil
 Ruhia Jamal
 Abdul Hamid Badawi
 Sultan Al-Jazzar
 Zaki Muhammad Hassan
 Muhammad Suleiman

External links 

 El Cinema page
 IMDb page

References 

Egyptian black-and-white films
1960 films
Films directed by Hassan al-Imam